Christmas with You is a 2022 American Christmas romantic comedy film written by Paco Farias, Jennifer C. Stetson and Michael Varrati, directed by Gabriela Tagliavini and starring Aimee Garcia and Freddie Prinze Jr.

Cast
Freddie Prinze Jr. as Miguel
Aimee Garcia as Angelina
Grace Dumdaw as Madison Sparks
Gabriel Sloyer as Ricardo
Deja Monique Cruz as Cristina
Zenzi Williams as Monique
Socorro Santiago as Frida
Lawrence J. Hughes as Barry
Nicolette Stephanie Templier as Cheri Bibi

Release
The film was released on Netflix on November 17, 2022.

Reception
The film has a 67% rating on Rotten Tomatoes based on fifteen reviews.

Noel Murray of the Los Angeles Times gave the film a positive review and wrote, "Still, Garcia and Prinze are so likable that it’s satisfying to see them spend an hour or so of screen time figuring out what the audience knows right away."

Samantha Bergeson of IndieWire graded the film a D and wrote, "Not even Santa Claus can save Christmas with You, and he wasn’t invited to make an appearance in this cheerless reminder that sometimes it’s better to have a Silent Night than a crappy movie."

Brittany Witherspoon of Screen Rant awarded the film three stars out of five and wrote, "It’s cheesy in all the right places and serious in very few, but Christmas With You is reliably sweet and sincere when it needs to be."

Ben Kenigsberg of The New York Times gave the film a negative review and wrote, "By far the sturdiest component of Christmas With You is Freddie Prinze Jr.’s hair. Who sculpted it to such a disconcerting spike? Did it time-travel from the late 1990s? Does gravity apply to it?"

Lauren Mechling of The Guardian awarded the film three stars out of five and wrote, "Christmas with You could hardly be a more generic title, and the 90-minute bundle of anodyne cheer lives up to its vanilla promise."

Courtney Howard of Variety gave the film a positive review and wrote, "Christmas with You is a holiday trifle for sure, but there’s enough to feel satiated — if just temporarily — by the festivities on display."

See also
 List of Christmas films

References

External links